Radio Windy was a local radio station in Wellington, New Zealand. Radio Windy first started by Capital City Radio Limited broadcasting in Wellington in 1973 on 1080 kHz with the call sign 2XW. In 1976 the station moved to 890 kHz and in 1978, after the AM band spacing in New Zealand was adjusted from 10 kHz to 9 kHz, the station moved to 891 kHz.

History
In 1990, Radio Windy began broadcasting on 100.0 MHz in Wellington and the station was renamed to Windy FM and also continued to broadcast on 891 kHz. In 1991 the 100.0 MHz frequency was taken over by The Frader Group used to start the very first More FM station in Wellington. Radio Windy subsequently began broadcasting on 94.1 MHz in Wellington and 98.1 MHz in the Hutt Valley. At the same time the station changed to a Classic rock format.

In 1993, the station was rebranded as The Breeze, the format of the station was changed to Easy Listening. In 1995 The Breeze was taken over by the More FM Group. The More FM Group was taken over by CanWest in 1997 and after CanWest merged with RadioWorks The Breeze became part of the RadioWorks group of stations. The format of this station was later rolled out across New Zealand by rebranding heritage stations as The Breeze and in some regions local shows replaced with network shows based from Auckland. The Breeze in Wellington was not initially affected by any of these changes and was a live and local station 24 hours a day 7 days a week, however the night show is now the Auckland-based network show.

In mid-2015 the 891 kHz frequency was changed to oldies music station Magic.

Radio stations in Wellington
Wellington City
Defunct radio stations in New Zealand
The Breeze (New Zealand radio station)